Cruiser Linhas Aéreas was an airline based in Curitiba, Brazil. It used to operate domestic services to 10 destinations in the states of Paraná, Rondônia and Mato Grosso, as well as charter and air taxi services within Brazil. Its main base is Curitiba-Bacacheri Airport (BFH).

History
The airline began with air taxi services, but added scheduled services on 4 June 2001.

On March 4, 2010 National Civil Aviation Agency of Brazil suspended the operations of the airline due to maintenance problems. The license was revoked on July 17, 2012.

Destinations
In February 2010, before having its operational license suspended, Cruiser Linhas Aéreas operated services to the following destinations:
 Aripuanã – Aripuanã Airport
 Barra do Garças – Barra do Garças Airport
 Cuiabá – Mal. Rondon International Airport
 Goiânia – Santa Genoveva Airport
 Guarantã do Norte
 Itaituba – Itaituba Airport
 Juara – Inácio Luís do Nascimento Airport
 Juína – Juína Airport
 Juruena – Juruena Airport
 Lucas do Rio Verde – Bom Futuro Airport
 Novo Progresso – Novo Progresso Airport
 Rio Verde de Goiás – Gal. Leite de Castro Airport
 Rondonópolis – Maestro Marinho Franco Airport
 Santarém – Maestro Wilson Fonseca Airport
 Sapezal
 Sinop – Sinop Airport

Fleet

As of June 2010 the fleet of Cruiser Linhas Aéreas included the following aircraft:

See also
List of defunct airlines of Brazil

References

Defunct airlines of Brazil
Airlines established in 2001
Airlines disestablished in 2010
Companies based in Curitiba